Compsoctena robinsoni is a moth in the Eriocottidae family. It was described by Pathania and Rose in 2004. It is found in the Himachal Pradesh region of India.

Etymology
The species is named for Dr. G.S. Robinson.

References

Moths described in 2004
Compsoctena
Moths of Asia